is a railway station in Hyūga, Miyazaki, Japan.

Lines

Layout 
The station consists of two side platforms serving two tracks at grade with a siding branching off track 1. The station does not have a staffed ticket window and only a waiting area is provided and this occupies only a part of a large multi-storey Japanese style building which also houses a community centre and Iwawaki City Hall branch. There is no staffed ticket window, only a waiting area. There is an accessibility ramp up to the station building. Access to the platform opposite the station building requires a footbridge but there is also a direct entrance to platform 2 on the other side of the tracks. Parking and a bike shed are available at the station forecourt.

Adjacent stations

History
In 1913, the  had opened a line from  northwards to Hirose (now closed). After the Miyazaki Prefectural Railway was nationalized on 21 September 1917, Japanese Government Railways (JGR) undertook the subsequent extension of the track as part of the then Miyazaki Main Line, reaching  by 11 October 1921. In the next phase of expansion, the track was extended to Tomitaka (now ) which opened as the new northern terminus on 11 October 1921. This station, then named , was opened on the same day as an intermediate station on the new track. On 25 May 1963, the station was renamed Minami-Hyūga. With the privatization of Japanese National Railways (JNR), the successor of JGR, on 1 April 1987, the station came under the control of JR Kyushu.

Passenger statistics
In fiscal 2016, the station was used by an average of 48 passengers (boarding only) per day.

See also
List of railway stations in Japan

References

External links
Minami-Hyūga (JR Kyushu)

Railway stations in Miyazaki Prefecture
Railway stations in Japan opened in 1921